Gaženica is a suburb of Zadar, Croatia, located about 3 miles southeast from the city center, by the Adriatic Sea. It is connected by the D424 highway.

Port of Gaženica
Gaženica is location of the commercial port of the city of Zadar—Port of Gaženica. Port coordinates are 44° 05.0' N, 015° 16.0' E ) The area is under a major redevelopment contracted to Austrian construction group Strabag, to be completed by 2013. Upon completion, the port will feature twelve piers: three for international lines, three for ro-ro ships and cruise ships, and six for the ships of the Croatian ferry lines.

References

Zadar
Populated places in Zadar County
Mediterranean port cities and towns in Croatia
Economy of Zadar